The Yale Journal of Law & Technology (YJoLT), formerly Yale Symposium on Law & Technology, is a law review of Yale Law School.

The 2014 Washington and Lee Law Review Rankings rated YJoLT the 75th overall law review, 30th in impact factor, the #1 online law review, and the #3 law review for "intellectual property" & "science, technology, and computing".

References

External links
Official website
YJoLT Blog sample

American law journals
Technology law journals
Yale Law School